Roland Wille (born 1 August 1961) is a Liechtenstein athlete who competed for his country at the 1992 Summer Olympics in Barcelona, Spain. In the Men's Marathon event he placed 68th with a time of 2:31.32. Wille was a member of the Leichtathletik Club Schaan.

Achievements
All results regarding marathon, unless stated otherwise

References
sports-reference

1961 births
Living people
Olympic athletes of Liechtenstein
Liechtenstein male long-distance runners
Athletes (track and field) at the 1992 Summer Olympics
Liechtenstein male marathon runners
World Athletics Championships athletes for Liechtenstein